Philip Nicol (born 1953, Caerphilly, Wales) is a Welsh painter.

Nicol graduated from Cardiff College of Art. He has been a lecturer at the Cardiff School and at Limerick Art College, Éire.

His paintings often portray twilight inner city landscapes.

He was winner of the Gold Medal for Fine Art at the National Eisteddfod of Wales in 2001.

Nicol was a member of the 56 Group Wales from 1984 to 1991. He is exhibition director at the BayArt gallery, Cardiff Bay.

His paintings are in the public collections of the National Museum of Wales, Newport Art Gallery and the National Assembly for Wales.

References

External links

Living people
1953 births
Welsh landscape painters
Alumni of Cardiff School of Art and Design
People from Caerphilly
Members of the 56 Group Wales
Welsh Eisteddfod Gold Medal winners
Welsh male painters